John Clark Curtin (8 November 1924 – 28 October 2019) was an Australian rules footballer who played with St Kilda in the Victorian Football League (VFL).

Notes

External links 

1924 births
2019 deaths
Australian rules footballers from Victoria (Australia)
St Kilda Football Club players
Ormond Amateur Football Club players